Craig Phadrig (Scottish Gaelic: Creag Phàdraig, meaning Rock of Patrick) is a forested hill on the western edge of Inverness, Scotland. A hill fort on the summit is generally supposed to have been the base of the Pictish king Bridei mac Maelchon (ruled circa 550–584). The hill is currently owned and managed by Forestry and Land Scotland.

Craig Phadrig fort
The summit of the hill is occupied by a vitrified fort; a stone structure affected by fire to produce a glass-like material. Beyond this is an outer wall and part of a third wall or hornwork to the east. Radiocarbon dates obtained in the 1970s suggest that the inner wall was constructed in the 4th century. Excavations at this time revealed evidence of Pictish occupation, including metal-working implements and French pottery, dating from the 7th century. The fort is a scheduled monument.

Bridei and Columba
Craig Phadrig is commonly assumed to have been the site where St Columba visited the Pictish king Bridei around 565. The event is recorded in Adomnán's Life of Columba, in which he describes several encounters between the two. The identification of Craig Phadrig is not universally accepted, and other sites including Urquhart Castle and Inverness Castle have been suggested.

References

External links
The Pictish Fort of Craig Phadrig: An Educational Resource, Forestry Commission Scotland

Hill forts in Scotland
Vitrified forts in Scotland
Pictish sites in Scotland
Scheduled monuments in Scotland
Mountains and hills of Highland (council area)
Inverness